The Deccas are a guitar based band formed in 2007 in the Medway Delta, currently signed to indie music label 208 Records.

The Deccas have played many gigs in and around Medway and London and have been described as short, sharp songsmiths  with a specific style of spiky power pop that has become synonymous with the Medway scene for many years.

History

Ways to the Sun

The band's self funded debut album was released on 15 August 2009 at The Nag's Head Pub, Rochester, Kent.  The album features 12 original tracks as well as a hidden acoustic track, Top of the World.  The album took several months to arrange and organise, only 3 days of which were actually spent recording at Ranscombe Studios, Rochester Kent.  Jim Riley and Dr Robert recorded and produced the album.

The Hammond organ heard on the album is played by Nathan Swan.  After 18 months with the band, Nathan left The Deccas in August 2009 shortly after the UK release of Ways to the Sun.

Cavern Club Liverpool
On 23 May 2009 The Deccas performed two shows in Liverpool at the world famous Cavern Club, Liverpool.  As part of the International Pop Overthrow festival The Deccas performed a lunchtime show at the Cavern Pub and an evening show at the Cavern Club.  As a result of the shows The Deccas picked up a distribution deal for the U.S with Kool Kat Musik

Radio Caroline Feature Show
On 11 January 2010 The Deccas were the subject of a special feature 60 minute broadcast with Ray Copeland on the world-renowned Radio Caroline.  The show which aired at 10pm GMT was dedicated to the band and took in a Desert Island Discs style section which involved each of the band choosing a song to play out.

The songs chosen were:

Wesley Wren - Rudie Can't Fail - The Clash
Phil Crane - I Am the Resurrection - The Stone Roses
Dave Sawicki - Angel of the morning - PP Arnold
Tony Hetherington - It's Gettin' Better (Man!!) - Oasis

Band members
Current Members
Wesley Wren - vocals, guitar (2007–present day)
Nick Rice - guitar, vocals (2010–present day)
Dave Sawicki - bass guitar (2007–present day)
Tony Hetherington - Drums, percussion (2007–present day)

Previous Members
Nathan Swan - Hammond organ, piano, keyboards (2008–2009)
Phil Crane - guitar, vocals, (2007–2010)

Occasional Liggers
Stuart Turner - harmonica
Robbie Wilkinson - guitar, vocals

Critical reception

BBC Radio Kent's Stephen Morris said of the band: "The Deccas are Kent based Mod Revisionists. It’s an exciting retro-sound that brings the feel of Mod right up to the 21st century. For all they’re use of Hammond organs and Sixties era harmonies there is nothing old fashioned or stale about this band. The music is fresh, vibrant and riotous. The Deccas are an exciting band that bridge the generations from the sixties to the present day. They have quite a few gigs coming up so try and check them out if you can."

"They deliver a superb old school, up beat rock performance. Every inch still in the Britpop scene, their vintage riffs brought The Who, Oasis, and even some Nirvana back to life. They described their sound as “mod revival”: a clever and catchy mix of the 60s with the early 90s". Pauline Eiferman - Surface Unsigned Festival

"Short, Sharp, Songsmiths - The Deccas" Love Music Hate Racism

Dublin Castle/Bugbear Promotions- Inspirals shaped 60s informed indie with an even more so Clint Boon swirling keyboard thang. Got real good energy these Deccas, a bit Clashy, a bit Stone Roses, a tad Julian Cope. Rousing and garagey, and stuffed fulla poptastic whistlability. Nice. Let’s also mention The Stranglers here…

International Pop Overthrow, Liverpool 2009 - Hailing from Medway, that veritable hotbed of mod garage pop, The Deccas stand out by infusing their mod sounds with a touch of Motown and Mersey. The songs on their debut EP, "The Way Things Were", are a swirling blend of organs, harmonies and energetic vocals that could just as easily be described as "The Way Music Should Be"!!

Scootering Magazine's Mark Sargeant - "The Deccas' influences, references and inspirations, intentionally or not, are there for all to hear. If all the best elements of 60's beat, 70's punk, 80's baggy and 90's Britpop were put in a blender, the result, i'm sure, would be a similar sound to that of The Deccas."

References

External links
 http://www.thedeccas.co.uk

English indie rock groups
Musical groups from Kent